Romantic? is the sixth studio album by English synth-pop band the Human League. It was issued by Virgin Records in 1990 and was the band's first album of new material in four years. Romantic? had several producers, most notably Martin Rushent, who worked with the Human League on their biggest commercial success (1981's Dare) and had walked out of the recording sessions for its 1984 follow-up (Hysteria). Also producing several tracks is Mark Brydon, who would be one half of musical duo Moloko several years later.

At the time of the album's release, the Human League had reached the nadir of a decline in popularity following the success of Dare nine years prior; this fall from grace was reflected in the song "The Stars Are Going Out," in which the band reflects upon their loss of fame and its impact on them. The song one writer called a "pointless and bland filler," was ditched as a potential third single.

The album signalled a critical and commercial low point for the band, which led to their long-standing contract with Virgin Records being terminated. The only significant success came from the album's first single "Heart Like a Wheel", which peaked at No. 29 on the UK Singles Chart and No. 32 on the U.S. Billboard Hot 100.  The second single "Soundtrack to a Generation" charted at No. 77 in the UK. The album itself peaked at No. 24 on the UK Albums Chart, and as a result the band moved to East West Records to release their next album, 1995's Octopus.

The Human League's live performance of "The Stars Are Going Out" on Later... with Jools Holland in 1995 was included on their 2003 The Very Best of the Human League DVD.

Track listing

Charts

References

External links

1990 albums
The Human League albums
Virgin Records albums